Ed, Eddie or Edward Moore may refer to:

Literature
 Edward Moore (dramatist) (1712–1757), English playwright, poet and editor
 Edward Moore, pen name of Edwin Muir (1887–1959), Scottish poet, novelist and translator

Politics
 Edward Moore, 5th Earl of Drogheda (1701–1758), Anglo-Irish peer and politician
 Sir Edward Moore, 1st Baronet (1851-1923), English politician, Lord Mayor of London
 Edward E. Moore (1866/67–1940), American politician in Indiana and California
 Edward H. Moore (1871–1950), American politician from Oklahoma

Religion
 Edward Moore (Archdeacon of Emly) (1714–1788), Irish Anglican priest
 Edward Moore (Canon of Windsor) (1798–1876), English Anglican priest
 Edward Moore (Archdeacon of Oakham) (1844–1921), English Anglican priest
 Edward Caldwell Moore (1857–1943), American Presbyterian pastor and theologian
 Edward Moore (Bishop of Travancore and Cochin) (1870–1944), English Anglican bishop
 Edward R. Moore (1894–1952), American Catholic priest, professor, social worker and author
 Edward Moore (Bishop of Kilmore, Elphin and Ardagh) (1906–1997), Irish Anglican bishop

Sports
 Edward Moore (rower) (1897–1968), American gold medalist Olympian in 1920
 Eddie Moore (baseball) (1899–1976), American infielder and outfielder
 Ed Moore, American drag racer in 1987 NHRA Winternationals
 Edward Moore (Irish cricketer) (1970–2021), left-arm pace bowler during 1990s
 Eddie Moore (American football) (born 1980), linebacker for Miami Dolphins
 Edward Moore (South African cricketer) (born 1993), left-handed batsman
 Ed Moore, Canadian curler who has played alongside Rene Comeau in 2020–21

Other
 Edward Mott Moore (1814–1902), American surgeon and medical lecturer
 Edward Chandler Moore (1827–1891), American silversmith and art collector
 Edward Moore (scholar) (1838–1916), English educator and writer about Dante
 Edward F. Moore (1925–2003), American professor of mathematics and computer science
 Edward Nathaniel Moore (born 1926), Ghanaian commissioner for justice and Attorney General

See also
 Edward Moor (1771–1848), British soldier for East India Company and author
 Edward More (disambiguation)
 Edwin Moore (disambiguation)